Stereotypes of African Americans are misleading beliefs about the culture of people of African descent who reside in the United States, largely connected to the racism and discrimination which African Americans are subjected to. These beliefs date back to the slavery of black people during the colonial era and they have evolved within American society.

The first major displays of stereotypes of African Americans were minstrel shows, beginning in the nineteenth century, they used White actors who were dressed in blackface and attire which was supposedly worn by African-Americans in order to lampoon and disparage blacks. Some nineteenth century stereotypes, such as the sambo, are now considered to be derogatory and racist. The "Mandingo" and "Jezebel" stereotypes sexualizes African-Americans as hypersexual. The Mammy archetype depicts a motherly black woman who is dedicated to her role working for a white family, a stereotype which dates back to Southern plantations. African-Americans are often stereotyped to have an unusual appetite for fried chicken, watermelon, and grape drink.

In the 1980s and following decades, emerging stereotypes of black men depicted them as criminals and social degenerates; drug dealers, crack addicts, hobos, and subway muggers. Jesse Jackson said the media portrays black people as less intelligent. The magical Negro is a stock character who is depicted as having special insight or powers, and has been depicted (and criticized) in American cinema. In recent history, Black men are stereotyped to be deadbeat fathers. African American men are also stereotyped as criminal and dangerous. African American are often stereotyped as hypersexual, athletic, uncivilized, uneducated and violent. Young urban African American men are often labelled as “gangstas” or “players.

Stereotypes of black women include being depicted as welfare queens or as angry black women who are loud, aggressive, demanding, and rude.

Historical stereotypes 

Minstrel shows became a popular form of theater during the nineteenth century, which portrayed African Americans in stereotypical and often disparaging ways, some of the most common being that they are ignorant, lazy, buffoonish, superstitious, joyous, and musical. One of the most popular styles of minstrelsy was Blackface, where White performers burnt cork and later greasepaint or applied shoe polish to their skin with the objective of blackening it and exaggerating their lips, often wearing woolly wigs, gloves, tailcoats, or ragged clothes to give a mocking, racially prejudicial theatrical portrayal of African Americans. This performance helped introduce the use of racial slurs for African Americans, including "darky" and "coon".

The best-known stock character is Jim Crow, among several others, featured in innumerable stories, minstrel shows, and early films with racially prejudicial portrayals and messaging about African Americans.

Jim Crow 

The character Jim Crow was dressed in rags, battered hat, and torn shoes. The actor wore Blackface and impersonated a very nimble and irreverently witty black field hand. The character’s popular song was "Turn about and wheel about, and do just so. And every time I turn about I Jump Jim Crow."

Sambo, Golliwog, and pickaninny 

The character Sambo was a stereotype of black men who were considered very happy, usually laughing, lazy, irresponsible, or carefree. The Sambo stereotype gained notoriety through the 1898 children's book The Story of Little Black Sambo by Helen Bannerman. It told the story of a boy named Sambo who outwitted a group of hungry tigers. This depiction of black people was displayed prominently in films of the early 20th century. The original text suggested that Sambo lived in India, but that fact may have escaped many readers. The book has often been considered to be a slur against Africans.

The character found great popularity among other Western nations, with the Golliwog remaining popular well into the twentieth century. The derived Commonwealth English epithet "wog" is applied more often to people from Sub-Saharan Africa and the Indian subcontinent than to African-Americans, but "Golly dolls" still in production mostly retain the look of the stereotypical blackface minstrel.

The term pickaninny, reserved for children, has a similarly broadened pattern of use in popular American theater and media. It originated from the Spanish term “pequeno nino” and the Portuguese term “pequenonino” to describe small child in general, but it was applied especially to African-American children in the United States and later to Australian Aboriginal children.

Black children as alligator bait 

A variant of the pickaninny stereotype depicted black children being used as bait to hunt alligators. Although scattered references to the supposed practice appeared in early 20th-century newspapers, there is no credible evidence that the stereotype reflected an actual historical practice.

Mammy 

The Mammy archetype describes African-American women household slaves who served as nannies giving maternal care to the white children of the family, who received an unusual degree of trust and affection from their enslavers. Early accounts of the Mammy archetype come from memoirs and diaries that emerged after the American Civil War, idealizing the role of the dominant female house slave: a woman completely dedicated to the white family, especially the children, and given complete charge of domestic management. She was a friend and advisor.

Mandingo 
The Mandingo is a stereotype of a sexually voracious black man with a huge penis, invented by white slave owners to promote the notion that black people were not civilized but "animalistic" by nature. The term mandingo is of 20th century origin; a corrupted word for the Mandinka peoples of West Africa, spanning from Mali, Guinea, Senegal, the Gambia, Côte d'Ivoire (or Ivory Coast), Ghana and Guinea-Bissau with minorities located in Sierra Leone and Liberia.

Sapphire 

The Sapphire stereotype is a domineering black female who consumes men and usurps their role, characterized as a strong, masculine workhorse who labored with black men in the fields or an aggressive woman, whose overbearing drove away her children and partners. Her assertive demeanor is similar to the Mammy but without maternal compassion and understanding.

Jezebel 
The Jezebel is a stereotype of a sexually voracious, promiscuous black woman, and was the counterimage of the demure Victorian lady. The idea stemmed from Europeans' first encounter with seminude women in tropical Africa. The African practice of polygamy was attributed to uncontrolled lust, and tribal dances were construed as pagan orgies, in contrast to European Christian chastity.

The supposed indiscriminate sexual appetite of black women slaves was used to justify their enslavers' efforts to breed them with other slaves, as well as rape by white men, including as a legal defense. Black women could not be found to be rape victims in court cases because they were said by whites to always desire sex. The Jezebel stereotype contrasts with the Mammy stereotype, providing two broad categories for pigeonholing by whites.

Tragic mulatta 
A stereotype that was popular in early Hollywood, the "tragic mulatta," served as a cautionary tale for black people. She was usually depicted as a sexually attractive, light-skinned woman who was of African descent but could pass for Caucasian. The stereotype portrayed light-skinned women as obsessed with getting ahead, their ultimate goal being marriage to a white, middle-class man. The only route to redemption would be for her to accept her "blackness."

Uncle Tom 
The Uncle Tom stereotype represents a black man who is simple-minded and compliant but most essentially interested in the welfare of whites over that of other blacks. It derives from the title character of the novel Uncle Tom's Cabin, and is synonymous with black male slaves who informed on other black slaves’ activities to their white master, often referred to as a "house Negro", particularly for planned escapes. It is the male version of the similar stereotype Aunt Jemima.

Black brute, Black Buck 

Black brutes or black bucks are stereotypes for black men, who are generally depicted as being highly prone to behavior that is violent and inhuman. They are portrayed to be hideous, terrifying black male predators who target helpless victims, especially white women. In the post-Reconstruction United States, black buck was a racial slur used to describe black men who refused to bend to the law of white authority and were seen as irredeemably violent, rude, and lecherous.

In art

From the Colonial Era to the American Revolution, ideas about African Americans were variously used in propaganda either for or against slavery. Paintings like John Singleton Copley's Watson and the Shark (1778) and Samuel Jennings's Liberty Displaying the Arts and Sciences (1792) are early examples of the debate under way at that time as to the role of black people in America. Watson represents an historical event, but Liberty is indicative of abolitionist sentiments expressed in Philadelphia's post-revolutionary intellectual community. Nevertheless, Jennings' painting represents African Americans in a stereotypical role as passive, submissive beneficiaries of not only slavery's abolition but also knowledge, which liberty had graciously bestowed upon them.

As another stereotypical caricature "performed by white men disguised in facial paint, minstrelsy relegated black people to sharply defined dehumanizing roles." With the success of T. D. Rice and Daniel Emmet, the label of "blacks as buffoons" was created. One of the earliest versions of the "black as buffoon" can be seen in John Lewis Krimmel's Quilting Frolic. The violinist in the 1813 painting, with his tattered and patched clothing, along with a bottle protruding from his coat pocket, appears to be an early model for Rice's Jim Crow character. Krimmel's representation of a "[s]habbily dressed" fiddler and serving girl with "toothy smile" and "oversized red lips" marks him as "...one of the first American artists to use physiognomical distortions as a basic element in the depiction of African Americans."

Contemporary stereotypes

Crack addicts and drug dealers 
Scholars agree that news-media stereotypes of people of color are pervasive. African Americans were more likely to appear as perpetrators in drug and violent crime stories in the network news.

In the 1980s and the 1990s, stereotypes of black men shifted and the primary and common images were of drug dealers, crack victims, the underclass and impoverished, the homeless, and subway muggers. Similarly, Douglas (1995), who looked at O. J. Simpson, Louis Farrakhan, and the Million Man March, found that the media placed African-American men on a spectrum of good versus evil.

Watermelon and fried chicken

There are commonly held stereotypes that African Americans have an unorthodox appetite for watermelons and love fried chicken. Race and folklore professor Claire Schmidt attributes the latter both to its popularity in Southern cuisine and to a scene from the film Birth of a Nation in which a rowdy African-American man is seen eating fried chicken in a legislative hall.

Welfare queen 

The welfare queen stereotype depicts an African-American woman who defrauds the public welfare system to support themselves, having its roots in both race and gender. This stereotype negatively portrays black women as scheming and lazy, ignoring the genuine economic hardships which black women, especially mothers, disproportionately face.

Magical Negro 

The magical Negro (or mystical Negro) is a stock character who appears in a variety of fiction and uses special insight or powers to help the white protagonist. The Magical Negro is a subtype of the more generic numinous Negro, a term coined by Richard Brookhiser in National Review. The latter term refers to clumsy depictions of saintly, respected or heroic black protagonists or mentors in US entertainment.

Angry black woman 
In the 21st century, the "angry black woman" is depicted as loud, aggressive, demanding, uncivilized, and physically threatening, as well as lower-middle-class and materialistic. She will not stay in what is perceived as her "proper" place.

Controlling image 
Controlling images are stereotypes that are used against a marginalized group to portray social injustice as natural, normal, and inevitable. By erasing their individuality, controlling images silence black women and make them invisible in society. The misleading controlling image present is that white women are the standard for everything, even oppression.

Education 
Studies show that scholarship has been dominated by white men and women. Being a recognized academic includes social activism as well as scholarship. That is a difficult position to hold since white counterparts dominate the activist and social work realms of scholarship. It is notably difficult for a black woman to receive the resources needed to complete her research and to write the texts that she desires. That, in part, is due to the silencing effect of the angry black woman stereotype. Black women are skeptical of raising issues, also seen as complaining, within professional settings because of their fear of being judged.

Mental and emotional consequences 
Due to the angry black woman stereotype, black women tend to become desensitized about their own feelings to avoid judgment. They often feel that they must show no emotion outside of their comfortable spaces. That results in the accumulation of these feelings of hurt and can be projected on loved ones as anger. Once seen as angry, black women are always seen in that light and so have their opinions, aspirations, and values dismissed. The repression of those feelings can also result in serious mental health issues, which creates a complex with the strong black woman. As a common problem within the black community, black women seldom seek help for their mental health challenges.

Interracial relationships 
Oftentimes, black women's opinions are not heard in studies that examine interracial relationships. Black women are often assumed to be just naturally angry. However, the implications of black women's opinions are not explored within the context of race and history. According to Erica Child's study, black women are most opposed to interracial relationships.

Since the 1600s, interracial sexuality has represented unfortunate sentiments for black women. Black men who were engaged with white women were severely punished. However, white men who exploited black women were never reprimanded. In fact, it was more economically favorable for a black woman to birth a white man's child because slave labor would be increased by the one-drop rule. It was taboo for a white woman to have a black man's child, as it was seen as race tainting. In contemporary times, interracial relationships can sometimes represent rejection for black women. The probability of finding a "good" black man was low because of the prevalence of homicide, drugs, incarceration, and interracial relationships, making the task for black women more difficult.

As concluded from the study, interracial dating compromises black love. It was often that participants expressed their opinions that black love is important and represents more than the aesthetic since it is about black solidarity. "Angry" black women believe that if whites will never understand black people and they still regard black people as inferior, interracial relationships will never be worthwhile. The study shows that most of the participants think that black women who have interracial relationships will not betray or disassociate with the black community, but black men who date interracially are seen as taking away from the black community to advance the white patriarchy.

"Black bitch" 

The "black bitch" is a contemporary manifestation of the Jezebel stereotype. Characters termed "bad black girls," "black whores," and "black bitches" are archetypes of many blaxploitation films produced by the Hollywood establishment.

Strong black woman
The "strong black woman" stereotype is a discourse through that primarily black middle-class women in the black Baptist Church instruct working-class black women on morality, self-help, and economic empowerment and assimilative values in the bigger interest of racial uplift and pride (Higginbotham, 1993). In that narrative, the woman documents middle-class women attempting to push back against dominant racist narratives of black women being immoral, promiscuous, unclean, lazy and mannerless by engaging in public outreach campaigns that include literature that warns against brightly colored clothing, gum chewing, loud talking, and unclean homes, among other directives. That discourse is harmful, dehumanizing, and silencing.

The "strong black woman" narrative is a controlling image that perpetuates the idea that it is acceptable to mistreat black women because they are strong and so can handle it. That narrative can also act as a silencing method. When black women are struggling to be heard because they go through things in life like everyone else, they are silenced and reminded that they are strong, instead of actions being taken toward alleviating their problems.

Independent black woman 

The "independent black woman" is the depiction of a narcissistic, overachieving, financially successful woman who emasculates black males in her life.

Black American princess

Athleticism 

Blacks are stereotyped as being more athletic and superior at sports than other races. Even though they make up only 12.4 percent of the US population, 75% of NBA players and 65% of NFL players are black. African-American college athletes may be seen as getting into college solely on their athletic ability, not their intellectual and academic merit.

Black athletic superiority is a theory that says blacks possess traits that are acquired through genetic and/or environmental factors that permits them to excel over other races in athletic competition. Whites are more likely to hold such views, but some blacks and other racial affiliations do as well.

Several other authors have said that sports coverage that highlights "natural black athleticism" has the effect of suggesting white superiority in other areas, such as intelligence. The stereotype suggests that African Americans are incapable of competing in "white sports" such as ice hockey and swimming.

Intelligence 

Following the stereotypical character archetypes, African Americans have falsely and frequently been thought of and referred to as having little intelligence compared to other racial groups, particularly white people. This has factored into African Americans being denied opportunities in employment. Even after slavery ended, the intellectual capacity of black people was still frequently questioned.

Stephen Jay Gould's book The Mismeasure of Man (1981) demonstrated how early 20th-century biases among scientists and researchers affected their purportedly objective scientific studies, data gathering, and conclusions which they drew about the absolute and relative intelligence of different groups and of gender and intelligence.

Media

Early stereotypes 

Early minstrel shows of the mid-19th century lampooned the supposed stupidity of black people. Even after slavery ended, the intellectual capacity of black people was still frequently questioned. Movies such as Birth of a Nation (1915) questioned whether black people were fit to run for governmental offices or to vote.

Some critics have considered Mark Twain's Adventures of Huckleberry Finn as "racist" because of its depiction of the slave Jim and other black characters. Some schools have excluded the book from their curricula or libraries.

Stereotypes pervaded other aspects of culture, such as various board games that used Sambo or similar imagery in their design. An example is the Jolly Darkie Target Game in which players were expected to toss a ball through the "gaping mouth" of the target in cardboard decorated using imagery of Sambo.

Other stereotypes displayed the impossibility of good relations between black and white people, instilling the idea that the two races could never coexist peacefully in society. The intent was to lead audiences to the conclusion of the proper solution to remove blacks from American society entirely.

Film and television 

In film, black people are also shown in a stereotypical manner that promotes notions of moral inferiority. For female movie characters specifically, black actresses have been shown to use vulgar profanity, be physically violent, and lack overall self-control at a disproportionately higher rate than white actresses.

African-American women have been represented in film and television in a variety of different ways, starting from the stereotype/archetype of "mammy" (as is exemplified the role played by Hattie McDaniel in Gone with the Wind) drawn from minstrel shows, through to the heroines of blaxploitation movies of the 1970s, but the latter was then weakened by commercial studios. The mammy stereotype was portrayed as asexual while later representations of black women demonstrated a predatory sexuality.

Fashion 
In print, black people are portrayed as overtly aggressive. In a study of fashion magazine photographs, Millard and Grant found that black models are often depicted as more aggressive and sociable but less intelligent and achievement-oriented.

Sports 

In Darwin's Athletes, John Hoberman writes that the prominence of African-American athletes encourages a lack of emphasis on academic achievement in black communities. Several other authors have said that sports coverage that highlights "natural black athleticism" has the effect of suggesting white superiority in other areas, such as intelligence. Some contemporary sports commentators have questioned whether blacks are intelligent enough to hold "strategic" positions or coach games such as football.

In another example, a study of the portrayal of race, ethnicity, and nationality in televised sporting events by the journalist Derrick Z. Jackson in 1989 showed that blacks were more likely than whites to be described in demeaning intellectual terms.

Criminal stereotyping 

According to Lawrence Grossman, former president of CBS News and PBS, television newscasts "disproportionately show African Americans under arrest, living in slums, on welfare, and in need of help from the community." Similarly, Hurwitz and Peffley wrote that violent acts committed by a person of color often take up more than half of local news broadcasts, which often portray the person of color in a much more sinister light than their white counterparts. The authors argue that African Americans are not only more likely to be seen as suspects of horrendous crimes in the press but also are interpreted as being violent or harmful individuals to the general public.

Mary Beth Oliver, a professor at Penn State University, stated that "the frequency with which black men specifically have been the target of police aggression speaks to the undeniable role that race plays in false assumptions of danger and criminality." Oliver additionally stated that "the variables that play contributory roles in priming thoughts of dangerous or aggressive black men, are age, dress, and gender, among others which lead to the false assumptions of danger and criminality."

New media stereotypes

Social media
In 2012, Mia Moody, assistant professor of journalism, public relations and new media in Baylor's College of Arts and Sciences, documented Facebook fans' use of social media to target US President Barack Obama and his family through stereotypes. Her study found several themes and missions of groups targeting the Obamas. Some groups focused on attacking his politics and consisted of Facebook members who had an interest in politics and used social media to share their ideas. Other more-malicious types focused on the president's race, religion, sexual orientation, personality, and diet.

Moody analyzed more than 20 Facebook groups/pages using the keywords "hate," "Barack Obama," and "Michelle Obama." Hate groups, which once recruited members through word of mouth and distribution of pamphlets, spread the message that one race is inferior, targeted a historically oppressed group, and used degrading, hateful terms.

She concluded that historical stereotypes focusing on diet and blackface had all but disappeared from mainstream television shows and movies, but had resurfaced in newmedia representations. Most portrayals fell into three categories: blackface, animalistic and evil/angry. Similarly, media had made progress in their handling of gender-related topics, but Facebook offered a new platform for sexist messages to thrive. Facebook users played up shallow, patriarchal representations of Michelle Obama, focusing on her emotions, appearance, and personality. Conversely, they emphasized historical stereotypes of Barack Obama that depicted him as flashy and animalistic. Media's reliance on stereotypes of women and African Americans not only hindered civil rights but also helped determine how people treated marginalized groups, her study found.

Video games
Representations of African Americans in video games tend to reinforce stereotypes of males as athletes or gangsters.

Hip hop music

Hip hop music has reinforced stereotypes about black men. Violent, misogynistic lyrics in rap music performed by African American male rappers has increased negative stereotypes against black men. African-American women are degraded and referred to as “bitches” and “hoes” in rap music. African-American women are over-sexualized in hip hop music videos and are portrayed as sexual objects for rappers. Hip hop portrays a stereotypical black masculine aesthetic. Hip hop has stereotyped Black men as hypersexual thugs and gangsters who hail from an inner city ghetto.

See also 

 African characters in comics
 African-American culture
 African-American history
 African-American representation in Hollywood
 Afrophobia
 Black matriarchy
 Colored people's time
 Coon song
 Discrimination based on skin color
 How Rastus Gets His Turkey
 Life as a BlackMan (board game)
 Lynching
 Lynching in the United States
 Mass racial violence in the United States
 Racial profiling
 Racial segregation
 Scientific racism
 Stepin Fetchit
 Criminal stereotype of African Americans
 Police brutality in the United States
 Race in the United States criminal justice system
 Uncle Remus
 Stereotypes of groups within the United States
 Stereotypes of Americans
 Stereotypes of Hispanic and Latino Americans in the United States
 Stereotypes of white Americans
 Stereotypes of East and Southeast Asians in the United States
 Stereotypes of indigenous peoples of Canada and the United States
 Stereotypes of Arabs and Muslims in the United States
 Stereotypes of South Asians
 Stereotypes of Jews
 Blonde stereotype
 LGBT stereotypes
 Ethnic stereotype
 Racism against African Americans
 Racism in the United States
 Racialization
Stereotypes of Africa

References

Citations

Bibliography

Further reading 
 
Anderson, L. M. (1997). Mammies no more: The changing image of black women on stage and screen. Lanham, MD: Rowman & Littlefield.
Bogle, Donald. (1994). Toms, coons, mulattoes, mammies, and bucks: An interpretive history of Blacks in American films (New 3rd ed.). New York, NY: Continuum.
Jewell, K.S. (1993). From mammy to Miss America and beyond: Cultural images and the shaping of U.S. social policy. New York, NY: Routledge.
Leab, D. J. (1975/1976). From Sambo to Superspade: The black experience in motion pictures. Boston, MA: Houghton Mifflin Company.
 Patricia A. Turner, Ceramic Uncles & Celluloid Mammies: Black Images and Their Influence on Culture (Anchor Books, 1994).
 
 

 
Articles containing video clips